Allora doleschallii (peacock awl) is a butterfly of the family Hesperiidae. It is found from Indonesia to the Solomon Islands, while subspecies Allora doleschallii doleschallii is found on the north-east coast of Australia.The name honours Carl Ludwig Doleschall.

The wingspan is about 40 mm.

The larvae feed on Rhyssopterys timorensis.

Subspecies
A. d. albertisi (Oberthür, 1880)  New Guinea
A. d. gazaka (Fruhstorfer, 1911) Buru
A. d. viridicans (Fruhstorfer, 1911) Aru, Key Island

References

External links
Australian Caterpillars

Coeliadinae
Butterflies of Australia
Butterflies described in 1860
Butterflies of Indonesia
Taxa named by Baron Cajetan von Felder